Lauda Europe Limited is a Maltese low-cost airline operating on behalf of its parent company Ryanair. The airline performs wet lease flights for Ryanair and charter services.

History
Lauda Europe is the successor of Austrian carrier Lauda. In 2020, Ryanair Holdings closed its Austrian unit in favor of Lauda Europe, a newly established Maltese subsidiary, and transferred Lauda's fleet of 29 Airbus A320 aircraft to the new airline. Lauda staff were offered new positions at Lauda Europe. 

In May 2021, Ryanair Group CEO Michael O'Leary stated that Lauda may move to an all-Boeing 737 fleet. On Thursday 13 July 2022 Ryanair Group CEO Michael O'Leary announced that Ryanair would extend the Lauda Europe Airbus A320 leases until 2028.

Fleet

As of June 2021, the Lauda Europe fleet consists of the following aircraft:

See also
List of airlines of Malta

References

Airlines of Malta
Airlines established in 2020
Ryanair
Low-cost carriers